Burttia is a genus of flowering plants belonging to the family Connaraceae.

Its native range is Tanzania to Zambia.

Species:

Burttia prunoides

References

Connaraceae
Oxalidales genera